Buried alive refers to a premature burial.

Buried Alive may also refer to: Someone who goes in a grave and gets buried alive in the ground

Film and television 
Buried Alive (1939 film), film directed by Victor Halperin
Buried Alive (1949 film), a 1949 Italian historical drama film
Buried Alive (1990 theatrical film), directed by Gerard Kikoine, based on the Edgar Allan Poe story
Buried Alive (1990 TV film), a television film directed by Frank Darabont
Buried Alive II (1997), its sequel
Buried Alive (2007 film), a horror film by Dimension Studios
Buried Alive (talk show), an Irish television show
Aziz Ansari: Buried Alive (2013), a 2013 comedy special that premiered on Netflix

Literature 
Buried Alive (novel), by Arnold Bennett
Buried Alive (play), by Leo Tolstoy
Buried Alive!, a children's novel by Jacqueline Wilson
Buried Alive: The Biography of Janis Joplin (1943–1970), biography of Janis Joplin by Myra Friedman
Buried Alive: The Elements of Love, a 1996 young adult book of poetry by Ralph Fletcher

Music 
Buried Alive (band), a metalcore band from Buffalo, New York
Buried Alive (video), a 2009 concert music video by Hanoi Rocks

Albums 
Buried Alive (Änglagård album), 1996
Buried Alive, a 2006 live album by Sentenced
Buried Alive: Live in Maryland, a 2006 album by The New Barbarians

Songs 
"Buried Alive" (Avenged Sevenfold song), 2010
"Buried Alive" (Dropkick Murphys song), 2003
"Buried Alive", by Alter Bridge from Blackbird (2007)
"Buried Alive", by Black Sabbath from Dehumanizer (1992)
"Buried Alive", by Front Line Assembly from Artificial Soldier (2006)
"Buried Alive", by Hypocrisy from Abducted (1996)
"Buried Alive", by Motörhead from Motörizer (2008)
"Buried Alive", by Axel Rudi Pell from Tales of the Crown (2008)
"Buried Alive", by Venom from Black Metal (1982)
"Buried Alive (Interlude)", by Drake featuring Kendrick Lamar from Take Care (2011)
"Buried Alive", by Logic from Under Pressure (2014)
"Buried Alive", by Flobots from Noenemies (2017)
"Buried Alive", by Rick Wakeman & Ozzy Osbourne from Return to the Centre of the Earth (1999)

Other uses
Buried Alive (performance), performance art series by monochrom
Buried Alive (non-profit organization), a  criminal justice reform advocacy organization
Buried Alive match, a type of professional wrestling match
In Your House 11: Buried Alive, a professional wrestling pay-per-view event produced by the World Wrestling Federation